Dmitry Nikolaevich Chechulin (in Shostka – 29 October 1981, in Moscow) was a Russian Soviet architect, city planner, author, and leading figure of Stalinist architecture.

Life 
Born in Shostka (Sumy Oblast, today in Ukraine) to a working-class family, after service in the Red Army Chechulin enrolled in the state school Vkhutemas and graduated in 1929, doing post-graduate work under Alexey Shchusev.

In the 1930s Chechulin was awarded commissions for four stations of the Moscow Metro, and developed his career to design a list of familiar Moscow landmarks.  From 1945 through 1949 he served as chief architect of Moscow.

Chechulin's work intersects with the Palace of the Soviets competition (the major event in Soviet architectural history) at multiple points.  He was among the twelve finalists in the final round.  He is credited for the Kotelnicheskaya Embankment Building, one of the seven Moscow vysotki (tall buildings) commissioned by Stalin after World War II as a "frame" for, and then in lieu of, the unbuilt Palace.  Chechulin had produced plans for the unbuilt eighth tower, the Zaryadye skyscraper, in 1947.  And when, after decades of neglect and delay, the huge excavation for the Palace of the Soviets finally became the world's largest open-air swimming pool in 1958, he was the architect.

Chechulin wrote nearly 40 books, pamphlets, monographs and articles on architecture, urban planning and design issues.  Among his many awards were Hero of Socialist Labour (1976), People's Architect of the USSR (1971), two Orders of Lenin, two Orders of the Red Banner of Labour, the Order of Honour, and three Stalin Prizes (1941, 1949, 1953).

He died 29 October 1981 and is buried at Novodevichy Cemetery.

Work 

The following works are in Moscow unless otherwise indicated:

 Komsomolskaya (Sokolnicheskaya Line) station, Moscow Metro, 1935
 vestibules for Okhotny Ryad Metro station, 1935
 Kievskaya (Filyovskaya Line) Metro station, 1937
 vestibules for the Dynamo Metro station, 1938
 the Moscow Pavilion at the All-Union Agricultural Exhibition, now the All-Russia Exhibition Centre, 1939
 Tchaikovsky Concert Hall, 1940
 the Victory Bridge (with sculptor Nikolai Tomsky), 1943
 the Stalinist skyscraper at the Kotelnicheskaya Embankment (one of the Seven Sisters), 1947–1952
 the Peking Hotel, 1955
 Moskva Pool, 1958
 the White House, 1965–1981
 the Rossiya Hotel, Moscow, on the site of the unbuilt Zaryadye tower, 1967 (razed 2006)

Sources 
 Chechulin's Palace of the Soviets entry
 list of buildings

1901 births
1981 deaths
Burials at Novodevichy Cemetery
Recipients of the Order of Lenin
Soviet architects
Full Members of the USSR Academy of Arts
Stalin Prize winners
Vkhutemas alumni
20th-century Russian architects
Heroes of Socialist Labour